Dieudonné Yougbaré  (February 16, 1917 – November 4, 2011) was a Burkinabé-born bishop of the Roman Catholic Church. At the time of his death he was one of the oldest Catholic bishops and the oldest one from Burkina Faso.

Yougbaré was born in  Koupéla, Burkina Faso, and was ordained priest on April 8, 1945. He was appointed the bishop of the Archdiocese of Koupéla (which was then a diocese) on February 29, 1956, where he remained until his retirement on June 1, 1995.

External links
Catholic Hierarchy

1917 births
2011 deaths
People from Centre-Est Region
Participants in the Second Vatican Council
20th-century Roman Catholic bishops in Burkina Faso
Roman Catholic bishops of Koupéla